is an announcer and news anchor at NHK, Japan's public broadcaster. She currently anchors NHK's Close-up Gendai current affairs program. Kuwako was born, raised, and educated in Kawasaki, Japan, and graduated from the School of Language and Culture Studies, Tokyo University of Foreign Studies (TUFS), where she majored in the Czech language.

Career

Hired by NHK following her 2010 graduation from TUFS, Kuwako began her career at NHK Nagano, where she served three years as a temporary correspondent and a host for local programs. She then served in a similar capacity at NHK Hiroshima; Waratchao!, a program for preschoolers, was the first program to feature her regularly. In 2015 Kuwako was assigned to Tokyo and appointed to serve as the host's "assistant" (sidekick) on NHK's much-watched Bura Tamori travelogue, a move that boosted her profile nationally. She also appeared as a presenter on news shows like NHK News 7 and Shutoken News 845. Later Kuwako anchored News Check 11 with Yoshio Arima from April 2016 to March 2017, and from April she and Arima began anchoring News Watch 9. She stepped down from News Watch 9 in April 2020 and, trading places with Mayuko Wakuda, began anchoring NHK News Ohayō Nippon, an early-morning news program.　In 2020, Kuwako narrated the closing travelogue segment of the year's Taiga Drama, Kirin ga Kuru (English title: Awaiting Kirin), and starting hosting with Takeshi Kitano the infotainment show Takeshi no Sonotoki Camera wa Mawatte Ita (Takeshi Presents: Camera Was Rolling At That Time). NHK announced on February 9, 2022, that Kuwako would leave NHK News Ohayō Nippon in April and begin hosting a revived version of Close-up Gendai, an in-depth current affairs program.

Personal life

Kuwako married Shinichi Tanioka, a Fuji Television announcer, on her 30th birthday, May 30, 2017, but Sankei Sports, a tabloid, reported that the couple had divorced just a year later. Kuwako married actor Yukiyoshi Ozawa on September 1, 2021.

Filmography

Current programs

Previous programs

NHK Nagano (2010 – 2012)

Television

Radio

NHK Hiroshima (2013 – 2015)

NHK Tokyo (2015 – present)

See also
 Tamori
 Yurie Omi
 Kozo Takase

References

External links
 Maho Kuwako at NHK Tokyo
 

|-

|-

|-

1987 births
Living people
Tokyo University of Foreign Studies alumni
Japanese announcers
Japanese television personalities
Japanese television presenters
Japanese women television presenters
People from Kawasaki, Kanagawa